Agaricus bisporus is an edible basidiomycete mushroom native to grasslands in Eurasia and North America. It has two color states while immature – white and brown – both of which have various names, with additional names for the mature state.

A. bisporus is cultivated in more than seventy countries and is one of the most commonly and widely consumed mushrooms in the world.

Names
 common mushroom
 white mushroom 
 button mushroom 
 cultivated mushroom
 table mushroom
 champignon (French for mushroom)
 Swiss brown mushroom
 Roman brown mushroom
 Italian brown mushroom
 cremini/crimini mushroom
 chestnut mushroom (not to be confused with Pholiota adiposa)
 baby bella

This form is commonly sold under the names portobello, portabella, or portobella; the etymology is disputed.

Taxonomy
The common mushroom has a complicated taxonomic history. It was first described by English botanist Mordecai Cubitt Cooke in his 1871 Handbook of British Fungi, as a variety (var. hortensis) of Agaricus campestris. Danish mycologist Jakob Emanuel Lange later reviewed a cultivar specimen, and dubbed it Psalliota hortensis var. bispora in 1926. In 1938, it was promoted to species status and renamed Psalliota bispora. Emil Imbach (1897–1970) imparted the current scientific name of the species, Agaricus bisporus after the genus Psalliota was renamed to Agaricus in 1946. The specific epithet bispora distinguishes the two-spored basidia from four-spored varieties.

Description
The pileus or cap of the original wild species is a pale grey-brown, with broad, flat scales on a paler background and fading toward the margins. The narrow, crowded gills are free and initially pink, then red-brown, and finally a dark brown with a whitish edge from the cheilocystidia. The firm flesh is white, although it stains a pale pinkish-red on bruising. The spore print is dark brown. The spores are oval to round and measure approximately 4.5–5.5 μm × 5–7.5 μm, and the basidia usually two-spored, although two-tetrasporic varieties have been described from the Mojave Desert and the Mediterranean, with predominantly heterothallic and homothallic lifestyles, respectively.

This mushroom is commonly found worldwide in fields and grassy areas following rain, from late spring to autumn, especially in association with manure. It is widely collected and eaten in many parts of the world; however, it resembles deadly or poisonous lookalikes (see below).

Lookalike species
The common mushroom could be confused with young specimens of the deadly poisonous destroying angel (Amanita sp.), but the latter may be distinguished by their volva or cup at the base of the mushroom and pure white gills (as opposed to pinkish or brown of A. bisporus).

A more common and less dangerous mistake is to confuse A. bisporus with Agaricus xanthodermus, an inedible mushroom found worldwide in grassy areas. A. xanthodermus has an odor reminiscent of phenol; its flesh turns yellow when bruised. This fungus causes nausea and vomiting in some people.

The poisonous European species Entoloma sinuatum has a passing resemblance but has yellowish gills, turning pink, and lacks a ring.

Cultivation history

The earliest scientific description of the commercial cultivation of A. bisporus was made by French botanist Joseph Pitton de Tournefort in 1707. French agriculturist Olivier de Serres noted that transplanting mushroom mycelia would lead to the propagation of more mushrooms.

Originally, cultivation was unreliable as mushroom growers would watch for good flushes of mushrooms in fields before digging up the mycelium and replanting them in beds of composted manure or inoculating 'bricks' of compressed litter, loam, and manure. Spawn collected this way contained pathogens, and crops would be infected or not grow. In 1893, sterilized, or pure culture, spawn was discovered and produced by the Pasteur Institute in Paris for cultivation on composted horse manure.

Modern commercial varieties of the common agaricus mushroom were originally light brown. The white mushroom was discovered in 1925 growing among a bed of brown mushrooms at the Keystone Mushroom Farm in Coatesville, Pennsylvania. Louis Ferdinand Lambert, the farm's owner and a mycologist by training, brought the white mushroom back to his laboratory. As with the reception of white bread, it was seen as a more attractive food item and became grown and distributed. Similar to the commercial development history of the navel orange and Red Delicious apple, cultures were grown from the mutant individuals. Most cream-colored store mushrooms marketed today are products of this 1925 chance natural mutation.

A. bisporus is now cultivated in at least seventy countries worldwide.

In the U.S., the white button form of A. bisporus alone accounts for about 90% of mushrooms sold.

Nutritional profile

In a 100-gram serving, raw white mushrooms provide  of food energy and are an excellent source (> 19% of the Daily Value, DV) of the B vitamins, riboflavin, niacin, and pantothenic acid (table). Fresh mushrooms are also a good source (10–19% DV) of the dietary mineral phosphorus (table).

While fresh A. bisporus only contains 0.2 micrograms (8 IU) of vitamin D as ergocalciferol (vitamin D2), the ergocalciferol content increases substantially after exposure to UV light.

Gallery

See also

Fungiculture
List of Agaricus species

References

Further reading

bisporus
Edible fungi
Fungi in cultivation
Fungi of Europe
Fungi of North America
Fungi described in 1926
Foods and drinks produced with excrement